Trippin is a Malaysian infotainment programme produced by 8TV, which sees local celebrities or (beginning season two) ordinary citizens being taken to various tourist attractions in the country, and involved in recreational activities, ranging from appreciation of arts and culture to extreme sports.

The programme has concluded its second season, which was hosted by Janice Yap. Rina Omar was the host of the show's first season.

Episode list

Season 1

Season One was hosted by Rina Omar, who is also currently one of the 8TV Quickie hosts.

Season 2
Season Two, hosted by Janice Yap who took over from Rina, has DiGi Prepaid Fu-Yoh! as the main sponsor, and in some episodes, subscribers of this service appear to participate in the programme by winning a preceding contest.

External links
Official Trippin website on 8TV — contains videos of full episodes from Season 2

2006 Malaysian television series debuts
2007 Malaysian television series endings
2000s Malaysian television series
8TV (Malaysian TV network) original programming